Marklesburg is a borough in Huntingdon County, Pennsylvania, United States. The population was 204 at the 2010 census.

History
The Marklesburg Historic District was listed on the National Register of Historic Places in 1996.

Geography
Marklesburg is located at  (40.384269, -78.172183). It is near the western shore of Raystown Lake, just uphill from the flooded village of Aitch.

Adjacent Municipalities
All municipalities listed are in Huntingdon County unless otherwise noted.
Penn Township
Lincoln Township

Demographics

At the 2000 census there were 216 people, 89 households, and 63 families residing in the borough. The population density was 243.5 people per square mile (93.7/km²). There were 138 housing units at an average density of 155.6/sq mi (59.9/km²).  The racial makeup of the borough was 99.07% White, and 0.93% from two or more races.
There were 89 households, 22.5% had children under the age of 18 living with them, 61.8% were married couples living together, 7.9% had a female householder with no husband present, and 28.1% were non-families. 25.8% of households were made up of individuals, and 13.5% were one person aged 65 or older. The average household size was 2.43 and the average family size was 2.92.

In the borough the population was spread out, with 18.5% under the age of 18, 10.2% from 18 to 24, 21.8% from 25 to 44, 28.7% from 45 to 64, and 20.8% 65 or older. The median age was 43 years. For every 100 females there were 89.5 males. For every 100 females age 18 and over, there were 89.2 males.

The median household income was $43,333 and the median family income  was $46,500. Males had a median income of $38,333 versus $20,000 for females. The per capita income for the borough was $22,329. About 3.0% of families and 6.0% of the population were below the poverty line, including none of those under the age of eighteen or sixty five or over.

References

External links
 Marklesburg, Pennsylvania (PA) Detailed Profile
 Marklesburg, Pennsylvania PA Community Profile - Huntingdon County, PA Data

Populated places established in 1844
Boroughs in Huntingdon County, Pennsylvania